Luis Menjivar Lopez (born 18 January 1994) is a Salvadoran race walker. He competed in the men's 50kilometre walk at the 2016 Summer Olympics.

References

1994 births
Living people
Salvadoran male racewalkers
Olympic athletes of El Salvador
Athletes (track and field) at the 2016 Summer Olympics
Place of birth missing (living people)
Athletes (track and field) at the 2015 Pan American Games
Pan American Games competitors for El Salvador
21st-century Salvadoran people